Saint Christopher of Trebizond was born in a village called Gazaree in Trebizond in the region of Pontus, Asia Minor.
He was the head of the Soumela Monastery on Mount Mela in the second half of the seventh century (641-668).
The Eastern Orthodox church celebrates his life on the 18th of August each year.

References

External links
Saint Christopher of Trebizond

7th-century Christian saints